The 1984–85 Oklahoma Sooners men's basketball team represented the University of Oklahoma in competitive college basketball during the 1984–85 NCAA Division I season. The Oklahoma Sooners men's basketball team played its home games in the Lloyd Noble Center and was a member of the National Collegiate Athletic Association's (NCAA) former Big Eight Conference at that time.  The team posted a 31–6 overall record and a 13–1 conference record to finish first in the Conference for head coach Billy Tubbs.  This was the first Big Eight Conference tournament championship and second Conference regular season championship for Tubbs.  This was Tubbs' first NCAA Division I men's basketball tournament #1 seed.

The team was led by All American and Big Eight Conference Men's Basketball Player of the Year Wayman Tisdale. The team lost two of its first four games, both to Illinois.  It then won four home games before losing to SMU in the Chaminade Classic in Honolulu, Hawaii.  The team then won four more before losing at Tulsa.  The team then won twelve in a row before losing at Kansas.  The team then won its last three regular season games, its three conference tournament games and its first three 1984 NCAA Division I men's basketball tournament games before it was eliminated in the elite eight round by Memphis.

Among his numerous accomplishments, Wayman Tisdale established the current Oklahoma Sooners men's basketball career scoring (2661), career scoring average (25.6), career rebounds (1048), single-season points (932) records. Tisdale became the first Associated Press All-American first team selection as a freshman, sophomore and junior and first three-time Big Eight Conference scoring champion.

Roster

Schedule and results

|-
!colspan=9 style=| Regular season

|-
!colspan=9 style=| Big 8 Tournament

|-
!colspan=9 style=| NCAA Tournament

NCAA basketball tournament

The following is a summary of the team's performance in the NCAA Division I men's basketball tournament:
Midwest
 Oklahoma (1) 96, North Carolina A&T (16) 83
Oklahoma 75, Illinois State (9) 69
Oklahoma 86,  (5) 84 (OT) (Sweet 16)
Memphis State (2) 63, Oklahoma 61 (Regional Final)

Honors
All-American: Wayman Tisdale (3rd of 3 times)
Big Eight POY: Tisdale

Team players drafted into the NBA
The following players were drafted in the 1985 NBA Draft:

The following players were varsity letter-winners from this team who were drafted in the NBA Draft in later years:

1987 NBA Draft: Tim McCalister (3rd, 47th, Los Angeles Clippers), David Johnson (4th, 89th, Dallas Mavericks), Darryl Kennedy (4th, 91st, Boston Celtics)

References

Oklahoma Sooners men's basketball seasons
Oklahoma
Oklahoma